Living With Lydia (Chinese: 肥肥一家亲 in Hong Kong, 肥姐驾到 in Singapore) was a Singaporean TV sitcom that aired on MediaCorp Channel 5 from 2001 to 2005.

Overview

Starring the Chinese-born Hong Kong actress/comedian Lydia Shum as Lydia Lum, a popular Hong Kong restaurateur/caterer and widowed mother to two children – 14-year-old daughter Apple and 10-year-old son Jordan – are forced to find a new locale when her Dim Sum establishment is hit with a case of food poisoning after she hosted an event and is ordered by the authorities to close her business (she is labeled "Dim Sum killer" by her former patrons, even though she is unaware that someone falsely accused her so they could force her out of business).

This new locale happens to be Singapore. This is because her late grandfather's best friend (referred to as Ah Gong) had written a will giving her half ownership of a house he had built thanks in part to his success in the seafood business – as well as the fact Ah Kong's life was saved decades before by Lydia's late grandfather.

However, when she arrives at the house, it is already occupied by Ah Kong's grandson, Billy B. Ong (Billy Boy Ong), who Lydia calls "Billy Bong". Billy prides his rise to the top of the ladder on promoting the company's specialty: fish balls. The presence of Lydia does not sit well with Billy at first but he does give in because it might be the only way to get Lydia to give up her part of the house. Additionally, her dim sum business brings in customers and clients for him.

Other characters include Billy's 14-year-old son Max, an aspiring anime artist, and Rhonda Chieng, Billy's secretary who is trying to pursue Billy and sees Lydia's untimely arrival as a threat to her plans at winning Billy's heart, despite the fact that his wife, who ran out on him, would show up in the third season (Rhonda would later lose interest in Billy in the final season). Another is Sulaiman Yusof, a former stuntman who now works as the maintenance man in Billy's company.

Episodes

Cast 
Samuel Chong – Billy B. Ong
Terence Tay – Maxwell "Max" Ong
Koh Chieng Mun – Ronda Chieng
Ng Hui – Apple Lum
Joel Chan – Jordan Lum
Lydia Shum – Lydia Lum
Suhaimi Yusof – Sulaiman Yusof

Production 
During the series run, there were rumors that Shum and Chong were dating off camera, but given that Shum was 11 years older than Chong, both denied this, saying that they were friends.

Opening sequence 
The entire opening sequence is animated. It starts in black and white with Billy B. Ong playing a song on the piano ("Humoresque", the series' theme song), followed by another clip of him eating a fishball. Billy then tries to push a fishball into his son Max, followed by a clip of Ronda brushing her hair and then moving closer to Billy. The song then stops, and a loud sound clip of Lydia shouting "Hi, Billy Bong" is heard. Lydia and her family then appear and fill the screen with color. Apple and Jordan then appear, and then some final shots with the entire cast of the show, before an animated Lydia appears again beside the show's title on an orange screen and laughs.

Release 
Episodes of Living with Lydia also aired in the United States on The International Channel (later renamed AZN Television) from 2003 to 2004 as part of the "Asia Street" lineup. In April 2006, up until the network left the air in April 2008, AZN bought the show back and was rerunning them three times a week due to popular demand, starting with the series' fourth and final season. It was also broadcast on TVB Pearl in Hong Kong and Jak TV in Indonesia.

The 4th season of the series was rebroadcast on Singapore's Channel 5 in 2008 as a tribute to Shum after her death.

DVD release 
On 29 April 2008 PMP Entertainment in Malaysia released a DVD collection containing all 52 episodes, which includes subtitles in Chinese, in Region 3-formatted countries. Although the DVDs are out of print, PMP is expected to re-issue the DVDs when it becomes available.

Accolades
The series was nominated in two categories at the 2003 Asian Television Awards, in which "Living With Lydia" was up for "Best Comedy Programme" and "Best Comedy Performance by an Actress" for Sum for her hilarious portrayal of the series' feisty title character. Sum won in the latter category and it was the show's only win at the event.

References

External links

Living with Lydia Programme Showcase
Article from 2003 featuring the cast

AZN Television original programming
2001 Singaporean television series debuts
2005 Singaporean television series endings
Singaporean television sitcoms
Singaporean comedy television series
Channel 5 (Singapore) original programming